Platyceroides is a genus of stag beetles in the family Lucanidae. There are about 16 described species in Platyceroides.

Species
These 16 species belong to the genus Platyceroides:

 Platyceroides aeneus (Van Dyke, 1928)
 Platyceroides agassii (LeConte, 1861)
 Platyceroides barrae Paulsen, 2017
 Platyceroides californicus (Casey, 1885)
 Platyceroides infernus Paulsen, 2017
 Platyceroides keeni (Casey, 1895)
 Platyceroides laticollis (Casey, 1914)
 Platyceroides latus (Fall, 1901)
 Platyceroides marshalli Paulsen, 2015
 Platyceroides opacus (Fall, 1906)
 Platyceroides pacificus (Casey, 1889)
 Platyceroides pampinatus Paulsen, 2017
 Platyceroides potax Paulsen, 2014
 Platyceroides thoracicus (Casey, 1895)
 Platyceroides umpquus Paulsen, 2017
 Platyceroides viriditinctus (Benesh, 1942)

References

Further reading

 
 
 

Lucaninae
Articles created by Qbugbot